The Carnet de Passages en Douane is a customs document that identifies a traveller's motor vehicle or other valuable equipment or baggage. It is required in order to take a motor vehicle into a significant number of countries around the world. The CPD system is managed by the Federation Internationale de l'automobile, duly mandated by the World customs organization and the United Nations Economic Commission for Europe.

Usage
The carnet allows travellers to temporarily import their vehicles, or other items of value such as broadcasting equipment, without having to leave a cash deposit at the border. It is, in essence, an international guarantee for payment of customs duties and taxes to a government should the vehicle or item not be re-exported from that country. Persons who temporarily import their vehicles or items into countries where the Carnet is required must agree to obey the laws and regulations of that country and particularly the conditions of temporary importation.

The Carnet contains relevant information about the items or vehicle – make, model, colour, engine capacity, seating capacity, registration number, owner and value.

In order to obtain a carnet, the owner of the items is required to provide a security based on the countries traveled to, age and market value of the items. Generally, four types of security are acceptable from motoring organisations:

 Cash bond
 Banker's letter of indemnity
 Insurance policy
 Loss Prevention Security – US and Canada only

The l'Alliance Internationale de Tourisme / Federation Internationale de l'Automobile (AIT/FIA) is the International Organizational body that advocates and maintains oversight of CPDs. The AIT/FIA is responsible for the inventory and distribution of CPDs within its CPD network of issuing and guaranteeing organizations. Recently, in May 2021, the AIT/FIA introduced the e-CPD Distribution system for the electronic issuance and authentication of CPDs. This was done to reflect the need for digitalization of official documents, these documents were originally mandated for cross-border mobility use by the United Nations Economic Commission for Europe (UNECE).

As the new eCPD Distribution mechanism was implemented, a new rebranding effort was done as well for CPDs.

Countries where a Carnet de Passages en Douane is required

The map below is based on the Overlanding Associations website, which is daily updated with additional information.

Varying sources differ slightly on exactly which countries require a carnet, however generally the following countries require a carnet for private vehicle entry.

Africa
Required for

Recommended for

Americas

Note that as of 2016 the carnet is rarely used on the South American continent, in spite of the lingering perceptions suggested by entries here. 

Required for

 (only recommended according to some sources) not required if Canadian
 (only recommended according to some sources) not required if Canadian

  (only recommended according to some sources) not required if Canadian

 (only recommended according to some sources) not  required if Canadian

Unless Canadian, recommended for

Asia & Middle East
Required for

Recommended for
 Foreigners cannot bring their own car to Bangladesh

Oceania

See also
Customs Convention on the Temporary Importation of Private Road Vehicles
ATA Carnet

External links
https://www.carnetdepassage.org/
https://www.gov.uk/ata-and-cpd-carnets-export-procedures
Alliance Internationale De Tourisme
A Guide to Carnet de Passage for Overland Travel
Overland travelers website explaining trip paperwork
http://www.go-overland.com/indy/articles/carnet.php
US and Canadian national guaranteeing association for Carnets de Passages en Douane

References

International travel documents
Customs duties